Madison Street may refer to:

 Madison Street (Manhattan)
 Madison Street (Chicago)
 Madison Street (Seattle)

See also
 Madison Place (Washington, D.C.)
 Madison Avenue (disambiguation)